Alfie Hewett and Gordon Reid defeated the defending champions Stéphane Houdet and Nicolas Peifer in the final, 1–6, 6–4, 7–5 to win the title.

Seeds

  Stéphane Houdet /  Nicolas Peifer (final)
  Alfie Hewett /  Gordon Reid (champions)
  Gustavo Fernández /  Maikel Scheffers (semifinals, fourth place)
  Joachim Gérard /  Stefan Olsson (semifinals, third place)
  Frédéric Cattanéo /  Evans Maripa (round robin)
  Daniel Caverzaschi /  Martín de la Puente (round robin)
  Kamil Fabisiak /  Martin Legner (round robin)
  Carlos Anker /  Ruben Spaargaren (round robin)

Draw

Finals

Group A

Group B

References

External links

Men's doubles draw

Masters, 2017